Maria Schalcken (1645–1699), was a Dutch Golden Age painter. She was a sister and pupil of Godfried Schalcken.

Biography
She was born in Dordrecht, the daughter of the rector of the school there. She was the younger sister of the painter Godfried Schalcken, who first learned to paint from Samuel van Hoogstraten and later from Gerard Dou.

According to the Nederlands Instituut voor Kunstgeschiedenis (RKD) she is known for genre works. Her self-portrait was attributed to her brother until it was cleaned in the 20th century and her full signature appeared.
She died in Dordrecht.

References

1645 births
1699 deaths
Dutch Golden Age painters
Artists from Dordrecht
Dutch women painters
17th-century women artists
Sibling artists